Marilia flexuosa is a species of mortarjoint casemaker in the family Odontoceridae. It is found in North America.

References

Integripalpia
Articles created by Qbugbot
Insects described in 1905